In financial mathematics, the Black–Karasinski model is a mathematical model of the term structure of interest rates; see short-rate model. It is a one-factor model as it describes interest rate movements as driven by a single source of randomness. It belongs to the class of no-arbitrage models, i.e. it can fit today's zero-coupon bond prices, and in its most general form, today's prices for a set of caps, floors or European swaptions. The model was introduced by Fischer Black and Piotr Karasinski in 1991.

Model
The main state variable of the model is the short rate, which is assumed to follow the stochastic differential equation (under the risk-neutral measure):

 

where dWt is a standard Brownian motion. The model implies a log-normal distribution for the short rate and therefore the expected value of the money-market account is infinite for any maturity.

In the original article by Fischer Black and Piotr Karasinski the model was implemented using a binomial tree with variable spacing, but a trinomial tree implementation is more common in practice, typically a log-normal application of the Hull–White lattice.

Applications
The model is used mainly for the pricing of exotic interest rate derivatives such as American and Bermudan bond options and swaptions, once its parameters have been calibrated to the current term structure of interest rates and to the prices or implied volatilities of caps, floors or European swaptions. Numerical methods (usually trees) are used in the calibration stage as well as for pricing. It can also be used in modeling credit default risk, where the Black–Karasinski short rate expresses the (stochastic) intensity of default events driven by a Cox process; the guaranteed positive rates are an important feature of the model here. Recent work on Perturbation Methods in Credit Derivatives has shown how analytic prices can be conveniently deduced in many such circumstances, as well as for interest rate options.

References

External links
 Simon Benninga and Zvi Wiener (1998). Binomial Term Structure Models, Mathematica in Education and Research, Vol. 7 No. 3 1998
 Blanka Horvath, Antoine Jacquier and Colin Turfus (2017). Analytic Option Prices for the Black–Karasinski Short Rate Model
 Colin Turfus (2018). Analytic Swaption Pricing in the Black–Karasinski Model
 Colin Turfus (2018). Exact Arrow-Debreu Pricing for the Black–Karasinski Short Rate Model
 Colin Turfus (2019). Perturbation Expansion for Arrow–Debreu Pricing with Hull-White Interest Rates and Black–Karasinski Credit Intensity
 Colin Turfus and Piotr Karasinski (2021). The Black-Karasinski Model: Thirty Years On

Short-rate models
Financial models